Maris is a unisex given name of Latin origin meaning "of the sea". It is derived from the phrase Stella Maris ("star of the sea"), an epithet for the Virgin Mary. Maris is used as a masculine name in Latvia, a unisex name in Germany and more often used as a feminine name in the English speaking countries and Estonia. In the latter, it is a short form of Maria.

People
 Maris, a saint and martyr of the group Maris, Martha, Abachum and Audifax
 Maris Sole Agnelli (1892–1935), Italian industrialist, principal family shareholder of the Italian car company Fiat
 Maris Cakars (1942–1992), editor of WIN (Workshop in Nonviolence) Magazine (anti-Vietnam War) from 1970 to 1976
 Maris (bishop), 4th century Bishop of Chalcedon
 Cora Mildred Maris Clark (1885–1967), New Zealand hockey player and administrator, nurse
 Maris Lauri (born 1966), Estonian politician
 Maris Mägi (born 1987), Estonian sprinter who specializes in the 400 metres
 Maris Martinsons, director of the Pacific Rim Institute for the Studies of Management
 Maris Bryant Pierce (1811–1874), Seneca chief, lawyer, land-rights activist
 Maris Rõngelep (born 1984), Estonian track and field athlete
 Maris Soule (born 1939), American author of romance, romantic suspense novels and short stories
 Maris Valainis, American construction consultant and a former actor
 Maris Wrixon (1916–1999), American film and television actress
 , German filmmaker and professor 
 Maris Bustamante, Mexican feminist artist

Mythical or fictional characters
 Maris (mythology), an Etruscan god depicted as an infant, perhaps related to the Roman Mars
 Maris Crane, fictional character from the TV show Frasier
 The main character in the anime Maris the Chojo
 Maris Pallitax, a character in the young adult fantasy series The Edge Chronicles
 Maris Brood, a character and boss in the video game Star Wars: The Force Unleashed
 Maris, brother of Atymnius in Greek mythology

See also 
 Māris (name), a Latvian masculine given name
 Maris the Great, promotional performance artist based in Denver, Colorado

Estonian feminine given names